Madison–Virgil USD 386 is a public unified school district headquartered in Madison, Kansas, United States.  The district includes the communities of Madison, Virgil, Lamont, and nearby rural areas.

Administration
It is currently under the administration of Superintendent Ryan Bradbury.

Board of Education
The Board of Education meets on the second Wednesday of each month.

Schools
The school district operates the following schools:
 Madison High School
 Madison Junior High School
 Madison Elementary School

See also
 Kansas State Department of Education
 Kansas State High School Activities Association
 List of high schools in Kansas
 List of unified school districts in Kansas

References

External links
 

School districts in Kansas